Language Sciences is a peer-reviewed journal published six times a year by Elsevier. The editor is Sune Vork Steffensen of the University of Southern Denmark.

The journal was founded by Thomas Sebeok in May 1968 as a publication of the Research Center for the Language Sciences at Indiana University. In its current version, the journal dates back to March 1979, when it was re-issued with Fred C.C. Peng as editor. A short history of the journal is featured in a 2017 editorial co-authored by Steffensen and the two Associate Editors at the time, Carol Fowler and Graeme Trousdale.

References

External links 

 Language Sciences — official journal page at publisher's website

Linguistics journals
Elsevier academic journals
English-language journals
Biannual journals
Publications established in 1979